A Landmate is a fictional powered armor suit mecha found in Shirow Masamune's manga Appleseed, as well as its anime adaptations.

In Appleseed, a large variety of Landmates exist, ranging from civilian construction units to heavily armed anti-gravity flight units employed by various police forces, armies, and even well-financed terrorist organizations. Most are similar in dimension, regardless of purpose, and stand between twelve and twenty feet tall, making them one of the smaller examples of Japanese mecha.

Design 
While there are countless versions of Landmates, including many not depicted in either the manga or anime (apparently there are even some designed for pest control purposes), all postwar, Olympus-built units seem to follow a fundamental design, a two-legged suit with four arms (two large ones, and two small flexible sheaths that contain the wearer's arms and are used for motion control), with a large chest cavity (where the wearer sits, their legs resting inside the partially hollow legs of the machine itself), and a camera-equipped head.

There is no glass windshield on most Landmates (other than civilian construction models) as this would compromise the tank-like armor capabilities; instead the wearer perceives his or her surroundings using a panoramic LCD monitor assembly inside the chest-cavity cockpit. Various heads-up displays are superimposed on the screens, the layout of which the pilot can personalize. Although the screen is integral to the routine operation of a Landmate, it is possible to pilot one without, such as in an emergency situation, as depicted twice in the film Appleseed Ex Machina.

As mentioned, Landmates have four arms. The two large ones are used for carrying items, frequently large weapons, and employ jointed, five-fingered mechanical hands. The two smaller arms, located below the first pair, are hollow and flexible sheaths, that contain the pilot's arms. Most military and police Landmates have a lightly armored, fingered glove at the end of the control arms, allowing the pilot to use their own hand for special purposes or weapons handling, whereas civilian models typically have a protective steel mitt.

Control methods 
Piloting a Landmate is a unique experience, given that the craft behaves as an extension of the human body, one that just does everything its wearer is doing. There are seemingly no physical controls in the cockpit, rather control is accomplished through motion-capture technology (very similar to that used to animate the movies) via the pilot's Datasuit, an undergarment that records nerve and muscle impulses. The electrostatic information gathered by the suit is then wirelessly relayed to a central processing unit, that manipulates the various motors and joint servos in order to mimic the pilot's motions in a proportionate, but much bigger scale.

Hazards 
The piloting process of a Landmate introduces several dangers to its human pilot. Walking or running, the very first activity to master, involves the user adapting their leg movements to the scale of the twenty-foot tall machine, whose stride will traverse three to four times more ground than their own, and the risk of tripping over obstacles is something few professionals underestimate. Artificial balance equilibrium is also difficult to perfectly accomplish in a Landmate, especially since the center-of-gravity can vary from model to model, and is very much affected by the heft of the handheld weapon—typically the size of a small cannon—being carried in the robotic arms of the machine.

Rash or sudden motions jeopardize the Landmate's stability and can threaten to easily topple it. In hostile scenarios, a small group of ordinary humans, if skilled, can roll-over an erect Landmate by precisely striking the ankles, as demonstrated by rioters in Appleseed Ex Machina.

Also, the hips of the machine can be easily dislocated, and untrained running is the primary cause of such accidents. As the user's legs pass through the Landmate's hips, a severe dislocation could easily break their bones or sever their legs entirely, so great care must be taken. In the years following the late 2120s, surface hovering, combined with jet-propulsion, has generally replaced running for high-speed transit as it is a lower risk practice.

Safety features 
Most Landmates appear to have an ejection system, which allows for the rapid escape of the pilot. When triggered, the Landmate's cockpit hatch blows off and over the left shoulder, while the rest of the body falls apart in segments, forcing the human inside forward while the extremities of the machine fall backwards and to the sides. Although it's practically useless while in flight (as the pilot doesn't wear a parachute) the ejection system is useful on the ground.

Civilian models, particularly those used in the construction industry, also feature a killswitch, located in various positions but most commonly between the "shoulder blades" on the back of the Landmate. When triggered, power to all the motors is cut, rapidly incapacitating the machine, should it be malfunctioning. Unusually, the killswitch can't be engaged remotely, which makes accessing it dangerous depending on the circumstances.

History

Early units 
Landmates existed in the Appleseed universe well before the events depicted even in the first book of the manga, The Promethean Challenge. While the industrial nation of Poseidon is credited with inventing them in the late 21st century, their extensive refinement and widespread public adoption is largely due to private-sector efforts in Olympus. Starting in 2124, first-generation handbuilt models were produced by automotive specialists and marketed as high-end personal transport or niche market construction machinery, and often sold alongside motorbikes and luxury automobiles at independent dealerships. Akechi Motors remains one of the most famous early dealers and promoters of the powered armor suits, as it was here that some of the very first Landmates designed for squad-based law enforcement and counter terrorism were designed, the brainchild of talented mechanic and engineer Yoshitsune Miyamoto.

"Guges" Landmate 
While Miyamoto's private-ownership Landmates had already become known for their quality and unique design, more or less Ferraris of the mecha world, where his efforts revolutionized the market lay in the creation of a prototype law-enforcement Landmate. His principles for this design revolved around several tenets:

Maximum mobility and agility in urban environments (for combat superiority against earlier-generation Landmates)
The use of variable-viscosity magneto-fluid bearings (for handling characteristics and shock-absorbency)
Minimal use of specialized components (for ease of repairs/upgrades) 

So popular was his armed Landmate variant, dubbed the Guges, that it quickly became adopted as a standard issue first-response and interceptor mecha for the Olympus S.W.A.T. and elite ES.W.A.T. paramilitary groups, and netted Akechi's first major fleet sale. By 2131, Miyamoto was inducted as a non commissioned officer of ES.W.A.T., and by then had diversified his skills with the addition of cybernetic engineering. Unsurprisingly, one of the first flight-capable Landmates, using Hermes/Damysos anti-gravity technology, was a late-model Guges, known as the D-Type.

Cyborg Landmates 
To accommodate large cyborg operatives of ES.W.A.T., special Landmates have since been created, starting with one for use by Briareos Hecatonchires. These units differ by featuring a much larger body cavity, and typically allow the cyborg's head to protrude outside of the body armor panels, allowing them to employ their own cybernetic-vision capabilities. However, Briareos typically still sports a helmet to further fortify himself against headshots by large-caliber ordnance fired by hostiles.

See also 
Mecha

References and notes 

Appleseed (media franchise)
Fictional armour